Ingvar Stadheim (born 9 February 1951) is a Norwegian football coach and former player. His son Anders is also a football player.

Playing career
Stadheim played for Sogndal.

Coaching career
Stadheim managed Norwegian clubs Sogndal and Kongsvinger, and later managed the Norwegian under-21 side between 1986 and 1988, and the Norwegian national side between 1988 and 1990.

References

1951 births
Living people
Norwegian footballers
Sogndal Fotball players
Norwegian football managers
Norway national football team managers
Kongsvinger IL Toppfotball managers
Sogndal Fotball managers
Association footballers not categorized by position